The 1999–2000 season was Cardiff City F.C.'s 73rd season in the Football League. They competed in the 24-team Division Two, then the third tier of English football, finishing twenty-first, suffering relegation to Division Three.

During the season manager Frank Burrows parted company with the club, being replaced by Billy Ayre.

Players

 

First team squad.

League table

Results by round

Fixtures and results

Second Division

Source

Worthington Cup (League Cup)

FA Cup

Auto Windscreens Shield

FAW Premier Cup

See also
List of Cardiff City F.C. seasons

References

Bibliography

Welsh Football Data Archive

1999-2000
Welsh football clubs 1999–2000 season
Card